L'Esprit Créateur is a quarterly academic journal established in 1961 and published by the Johns Hopkins University Press. The journal is dedicated to the study of French and Francophone literature, and the literary and cultural criticism surrounding them. Each issue focuses on a specific theme or critical issue and includes reviews and illustrations. The journal's founding editor was John Erickson. The current editors-in-chief are Mária Minich Brewer and Daniel Brewer (Department of French and Italian, University of Minnesota).

External links 
 
 L’Esprit Créateur on the Johns Hopkins University Press website
 L’Esprit Créateur at Project MUSE

Literary magazines published in the United States
French literature
Multilingual journals
English-language journals
French-language journals
Publications established in 1961
Quarterly journals
Johns Hopkins University Press academic journals